Malafon (MArine LAtécoère FONds) was a French ship-launched anti-submarine missile system. Developed in the 1950s and 1960s, the weapon was intended to take advantage of the greater detection ranges possible with towed sonar arrays. The missile entered service in 1966 and was manufactured by Groupe Latécoère

The weapon is essentially a glider-delivered version of the L4 torpedo. The launcher is a circular mount, which allows the weapon to be rotated to the correct bearing, then fired at a fixed elevation of +15°. Two solid booster rockets accelerate it to  within 4 seconds before falling away. As it reaches the target, the glider drops the torpedo, which splashes into the sea and commences a circular search pattern. The range of the Malafon meant that it was expected to hit the water within  of the submarine's location.

The Malafon was a large weapon, with each missile weighing . As a result, it was only employed on larger vessels. It was typically used for medium- and long-range submarine targets, though it could have been used against surface ships.

The system was never used at war. It was declared obsolete in 1997. It was replaced by Westland Lynx helicopters using Mark 46 torpedoes.

Ships
The Malafon system was fitted to the following ship classes

 
 T56 (La Galissonnière)

Specifications

The missile had a  wingspan, with the main body having a  diameter. The torpedo had a  diameter and could dive to  depth.

External links

Harpoondatabase
Article

Anti-submarine missiles
Cold War weapons of France
Naval weapons of France
Military equipment introduced in the 1960s